2007 J.League Cup Final was the 15th final of the J.League Cup competition. The final was played at National Stadium in Tokyo on November 3, 2007. Gamba Osaka won the championship.

Match details

See also
2007 J.League Cup

References

J.League Cup
2007 in Japanese football
Gamba Osaka matches
Kawasaki Frontale matches